Rui Moreira may refer to:

Rui Moreira (politician) (born 1956), Portuguese politician
Rui Moreira (footballer) (born 1996), Portuguese footballer